The ManKind Initiative is a domestic violence charity based in the United Kingdom  and is at the forefront of providing support for male victims of domestic abuse and violence. Since becoming a charity in 2001, it has provided a helpline, training and support for statutory agencies (primarily the police and local authorities) and campaigns to ensure that equal recognition is given to male victims in the same way that recognition is given to female victims of domestic abuse. It is one of only a few charities in the country to help male victims.

The organisation is based in Taunton  and was founded in 2001.

Objectives
The ManKind Initiative believes that support should be provided to male victims of domestic violence as all victims of domestic violence and abuse should be helped. It rejects the gender-based approach to the issue used by the government, local authorities and police, and instead demonstrates that domestic violence can happen to anyone and is a societal and family problem.

The organisation is committed to challenging harmful gender-based domestic violence policies and ensuring help is available to all, regardless of gender, race or sexual orientation. It strongly believes men and women should work together to tackle the issue of domestic violence, that gender politics need to be removed from the issue and that victims should be treated as individuals. The ManKind Initiative is gender inclusive in its approach and holds that domestic abuse support and recognition for victims should not be based on a “competition” between the genders.

Activities

The ManKind Initiative runs a helpline for male victims across the UK, advising and supporting over 100,000 men every year. It refers victims to relevant services or accommodation that might be available to them. The organisation campaigns for recognition of male victims, provision of domestic violence shelters for men and seeks more services at a local level. Due to a lack of funding, the helpline has limited hours.

The organisation has been increasingly successful in recent times in beginning to highlight the plight of male victims and change attitudes towards domestic violence. Notable successes include forcing retailer Superdrug to withdraw products promoting domestic violence against men.

It also regularly challenges the authorities to ensure they do not forget the plight of male victims. Recent campaigns include challenging the Equalities and Human Rights Commission, the Crown Prosecution Service and Mayor of London.

Violence is Violence video
On 22 May 2014 the organisation released a video titled "Violence is violence" highlighting different public reactions to male and female victims of domestic violence being abused on public. The organisation set up hidden cameras in a London park then filmed the public's reactions to two scenarios: a man abusing a woman and a woman abusing a man. Members of the public intervened when the male attacked the female, with a woman threatening to call the police and another member of the public offering the victim refuge in his office. Meanwhile, in the case of the woman attacking her male partner, members of the public failed to intervene, with many staring and even laughing. The video campaign, created by Dare London, went viral, receiving over 5 million views in less than a week. Mark Brooks of the Mankind Initiative argued that, "A sign of living in an equal society is where men suffering from domestic violence are recognised and supported in the same way that female victims rightly are," adding "The fact that in 2014 this is not the case shows the change that is still needed, especially as many men fear they won't be believed if they come forward." The advert won the 2015 D&AD award for Tactical Branded Film Content & Entertainment.

Funding

The ManKind Initiative has four part-time staff who work alongside volunteers. It receives little funding, with an income of only £49,938 in 2010. Due to the lack of funds the organisation's helpline has faced the possibility of closure on at least two occasions.

The organisation receives no government support, relying on donations. Funding partners include: The Tudor Trust, The Lankelly Chase Trust, The Nationwide Foundation, The National Lottery, The Royal Agricultural University, Newman University, Weston-Super-Mare Carnival and Hogg Robinson.

Patrons and supporters

The organisation's patrons include Erin Pizzey (founder of the world first domestic violence shelters), Lord Cotter, John Penrose MP and Liz Lynne MEP from 1999–2012.

The Chairman is Mark Brooks and the organisation has six trustees. As a result of his work at the ManKind Initiative, Brooks was awarded an OBE in the 2019 New Year Honours, with the honour given "for services to male victims of domestic abuse".

References

External links
ManKind Initiative Website

See also
 Parity (charity)
 Women's Aid Federation of England
 Erin Pizzey
 Refuge (United Kingdom charity)
 Earl Silverman

Domestic violence-related organizations
Family and parenting issues groups in the United Kingdom
Organizations established in 2001
Charities based in Somerset
Men's rights organizations
Organisations based in Taunton
Violence against men in the United Kingdom
History of Somerset